Lamina is a genus of South Pacific araneomorph spiders in the family Toxopidae, and was first described by Raymond Robert Forster in 1970.

Species
 it contains four species, all found in New Zealand:
Lamina minor Forster, 1970 (type) – New Zealand
Lamina montana Forster, 1970 – New Zealand
Lamina parana Forster, 1970 – New Zealand
Lamina ulva Forster, 1970 – New Zealand

References

External links

Araneomorphae genera
Taxa named by Raymond Robert Forster
Toxopidae